Torynorrhina flammea is a beetle  of the family Scarabaeidae, subfamily Cetoniinae.

Description
In the females  tibia of fore legs are wider. This species is characterized by great variability in colours (cobalt blue, emerald green, scarlet red, etc.).

Distribution
This flower beetle is present in Thailand, Assam, Malaysia and China.

It has been recorded feeding on sorghum in India.

Subspecies
 Torynorrhina flammea cariana (Gestro, 1891)
 Torynorrhina flammea flammea (Gestro, 1888)
 Torynorrhina flammea incisa Arrow, 1910
 Torynorrhina flammea malayana  Miksic, 1980
 Torynorrhina flammea chicheryi, Ruter, 1980 (sometimes considered a species - Torynorrhina chicheryi)

Gallery

References

Biolib
Zipcodezoo
Global names
Flower beetles

External links
Living jewels
Animal life forms

Cetoniinae
Beetles described in 1888
Insect pests of millets